The following is a list of the 314 communes of the Tarn department of France.

The communes cooperate in the following intercommunalities (as of 2020):
Communauté d'agglomération de l'Albigeois
Communauté d'agglomération de Castres Mazamet
Communauté d'agglomération Gaillac-Graulhet
Communauté de communes Carmausin-Ségala
Communauté de communes Centre Tarn
Communauté de communes du Cordais et du Causse
Communauté de communes Lauragais Revel Sorezois (partly)
Communauté de communes du Lautrécois-Pays d'Agout
Communauté de communes des Monts d'Alban et du Villefranchois
Communauté de communes des Monts de Lacaune et de la Montagne du Haut Languedoc (partly)
Communauté de communes du Quercy Rouergue et des gorges de l'Aveyron (partly)
Communauté de communes Sidobre Vals et Plateaux
Communauté de communes du Sor et de l'Agout
Communauté de communes Tarn-Agout (partly)
Communauté de communes Thoré Montagne Noire
Communauté de communes Val 81

References

Tarn